Ghost of the Well of Souls is the tenth and final novel in the Well of Souls series by American author Jack L. Chalker. It concludes the narrative begun in The Sea is Full of Stars.

External links
 
 Ghost of the Well of Souls at Worlds Without End

2000 American novels
2000 science fiction novels
American science fiction novels
Novels by Jack L. Chalker
Del Rey books